Hamma is a transfer station serving the Line 1 of the Algiers Metro.

Etymology

References

External links
 Algiers Metro Site
 Ligne 1 Algiers Metro on Structurae

Algiers Metro stations
Railway stations opened in 2011
Railway stations in Algeria opened in the 21st century